Mufasa is a song recorded by Nigerian singer-songwriter Tekno, it was released in February 23, 2022, by PWRS and Cartel Entertainment. It was written by Tekno and  produced by Yung Willis.

The song received mostly positive reviews from music critics and tops the Apple Music on top 100 charts in Nigeria, and debut at 23 on TurnTable Top 50 chart.

Background and reception

Tekno returns after dropping his debut album Old Romance to announce the release of Mufasa.
The song is characterised as an Afropop song with elements of R&B.
The music video was released this same day, on the 23 February 2022.

Commercial performance

The video debut on Soundcity's Naija Top 20, and also on MTV Base's Official Naija Top 10. It peak at 23 on TurnTable Top 50 chart and spent one week.
OkayAfrica describe the style ‘on the elements he typically masters, afro-fusion percussion, light synths and a strong vocal delivery’ and include it on the Best Nigerian Songs of the Month (February).

Release history

References

2022 songs

2022 singles

Nigerian afropop songs